Helen Fein (1934 – May 14, 2022) was a historical sociologist and professor who specializes on genocide, human rights, collective violence and other issues. She is an author and editor of four books and monographs, a former associate of the International Security Program (Harvard University), and a founder and first president of the International Association of Genocide Scholars. She was the executive director of the Institute for the Study of Genocide (City University of New York). She died on May 14, 2022.

Publications
 Genocide Watch, 1992.
 Genocide: A Sociological Perspective, 1993
 Accounting for Genocide, 1979
 Human Rights and Wrongs, 2007

References

1934 births
2022 deaths
American sociologists
American women sociologists
21st-century American women